
Gmina Lipnica Murowana is a rural gmina (administrative district) in Bochnia County, Lesser Poland Voivodeship, in southern Poland.

The gmina contains part of the protected area called Wiśnicz-Lipnica Landscape Park.

Villages
Gmina Lipnica Murowana contains the villages and settlements of Borówna, Lipnica Dolna, Lipnica Górna, Lipnica Murowana and Rajbrot.

Neighbouring gminas
Gmina Lipnica Murowana is bordered by the gminas of Czchów, Gnojnik, Iwkowa, Laskowa, Nowy Wiśnicz and Żegocina.

References
 Gmina Lipnica Murowana
 Polish official population figures 2006

Lipnica Murowana
Bochnia County